Shellenberger is a surname of German origin. Its German spelling is Schellenberger. Notable people with the surname include:

Allen Shellenberger (1969–2009), American rock drummer
Betty Shellenberger (1921–2019), American field hockey player and coach
John S. Shellenberger (1839–1911), American Civil War Medal of Honor recipient
Michael Shellenberger (born 1971), American writer, advocate of nuclear power, and self-described ecomodernist
Susie Shellenberger, American motivational speaker, writer, and magazine editor

See also
 Schellenberger, a surname
 Schellenberg (disambiguation)
 Shallenberger, a surname